The List of German-language television channels includes the following channels:

Austria

Germany

Italy
South Tyrol
 Rai Südtirol
 Südtirol Digital Fernsehen
 Südtirol Heute

Liechtenstein

Switzerland

Other countries

Programmes in other countries

See also
 Lists of television channels
 Television in the German Democratic Republic

References

German

German-language television